Odoardo Farnese (6 December 1573 – 21 February 1626) was an Italian nobleman, the second son of Alessandro Farnese, Duke of Parma and Maria of Portugal, known for his patronage of the arts. He became a Cardinal of the Roman Catholic Church in 1591, and briefly acted as regent of the Duchy of Parma and Piacenza for his nephew Odoardo from 1622 to 1626.

Cardinal Odoardo is probably best known today for commissioning the Bolognese artist Annibale Carracci to fresco the Camerino in the Palazzo Farnese in Rome. Carracci undertook this from 1595 to 1597, just prior to starting his decoration of the more famous and elaborate Farnese Gallery in the same palace.

The Camerino

The Camerino was Farnese's private study. The subject of the central scene in the ceiling is  The Choice of Hercules. The scene is surrounded by a painted frame, an example of quadro riportato, which gives the illusion of a framed oil painting hung on the ceiling when in reality both the scene and its frame were frescoed. This quadro riportato device was brought to fruition by Carracci in the Farnese Gallery a few years later.

In addition, Farnese commissioned various oil paintings from Carracci,  including his Rinaldo and Armida now in the Capodimonte Museum in Naples and Christ in Glory with Saints and Odoardo Farnese now in the Galleria Palatina in Florence. It was on Carracci's recommendation that he commissioned Domenichino to fresco the Chapel of St Nilo in the abbey at Grottaferrata. Farnese also commissioned Carracci's Sleeping Venus.

His patronage of architecture was less extensive but included the Casa Professa, the Jesuit house adjacent to the church of the Gesu in Rome, by the architect Girolamo Rainaldi.

Ancestry

References

Bibliography

See also
The Choice of Hercules (Carracci)

External links 

1573 births
1626 deaths
Odoardo
Clergy from Rome
17th-century Italian cardinals
Cardinal-bishops of Frascati
Odoardo
16th-century Italian Roman Catholic priests
Regents of Parma
Italian art patrons
Nobility from Rome
Sons of monarchs